"Flake" is a song written and performed by American singer-songwriter Jack Johnson. It is Johnson's debut single and was released as the only single from his first album, Brushfire Fairytales (2001). "Flake" features Ben Harper on Weissenborn slide guitar and Tommy Jordan on steel drums.

"Flake" was a minor success for Johnson in the United States, becoming his first entry on the US Billboard Hot 100 at number 73 and peaking at number one on the Billboard Adult Alternative Songs chart. In New Zealand, it reached number six and became the sixth-most-successful song of 2003; it remains Johnson's sole top-10 hit there. "Flake" has become a popular song in Johnson's live performances and still garners radio airplay.

Track listings
European CD single
 "Flake" – 4:42
 "Flake" (live) – 4:31

European maxi-CD single
 "Flake" – 4:42
 "Flake" (live) – 4:31
 "It's All Understood" – 3:35
 "Inaudible Melodies" – 3:36

Charts

Weekly charts

Year-end charts

Certifications

References

2000 songs
2002 debut singles
Jack Johnson (musician) songs
Songs written by Jack Johnson (musician)